Rampini is a surname. Notable people with the surname include:

Alessandro Rampini (1896–1995), Italian footballer
Carlo Rampini (1891–1968), Italian footballer
Federico Rampini (born 1956), Italian journalist, writer and lecturer
Giacomo Rampini (1680–1760), Italian composer of operas, oratorios and sacred music